Chromosome 1 open reading frame 109 is a protein in humans that is encoded by the C1orf109 gene.

Clinical significance 
This gene may play a role in cancer cell proliferation.

References

External links
 

Uncharacterized proteins